The Sulphur Springs School District is an elementary school district in Los Angeles County, California. It serves the east side of the Santa Clarita Valley, including most of Canyon Country. As of August 2012, it has 9 elementary schools.

The district's headquarters are located off Via Princessa in Canyon Country, near the Via Princessa Metrolink station.

Schools
All SSSD schools are within Santa Clarita city limits, except for Mint Canyon Community School, which is in an unincorporated area. Schools within the Sulphur Springs School District refer to themselves as "community schools," unlike schools in the Saugus and Newhall school districts which refer to themselves as "elementary schools."

References

External links
 

School districts in Los Angeles County, California
Education in Santa Clarita, California
1872 establishments in California
School districts established in 1872